Marcian was a Byzantine general and a kinsman of Emperor Justin II.

According to John Malalas, he was Justin's cousin, and a nephew of Justinian I, while Michael the Syrian reports that his mother was Justin's maternal aunt.

He was involved in the Roman–Persian War of 572–591:

Marcian defeated Miranes at the Battle of Sargathon near Nisibis and put him to flight; 1200 Persians were killed and seventy taken prisoners, while the Roman loss was only seven. Marcian then laid siege to Nisibis and Theobothon. Chosroes, when he heard of this got together 40,000 cavalry and more than 100,000 infantry, and hastened to its assistance to attack the Romans. In the meantime Marcian was accused to the emperor of aiming at the throne. Justin, persuaded of the truth of the charge, dismissed him from the command and appointed Theodore, the son of Justinian surnamed Tzirus, in his stead. This led to disturbances, the Romans raised the siege, and Chosroes besieged and reduced Daras.

References

Sources 
 
 

6th-century Byzantine people
Byzantine generals
Justinian dynasty
Magistri militum
Patricii
People of the Roman–Sasanian Wars